Jack Wigglesworth is a British businessman, founder and former chairman of LIFFE.

Jack Wigglesworth has an MA from Oxford University in philosophy, politics and economics.

In 1997, Wigglesworth was appointed chairman of ABN Amro.

Wigglesworth is president of London Asia Capital and director of Gresham College.

In 2006-07 he was Master of the Worshipful Company of World Traders, one of the City of London's 110 livery companies.

References

1940s births
British businesspeople
Living people
Alumni of the University of Oxford
British Eurosceptics